The 2001 FIVB Girls Youth Volleyball World Championship was held in Pula and Rijeka, Croatia from 22 to 30 September 2001.

Qualification process

First round

Pool A

|}

|}

Pool B

|}

|}

Pool C

|}

|}

Pool D

|}

|}

Second round

Play off – elimination group

|}

Play off – seeding group

|}

Final round

Quarterfinals

|}

5th–8th semifinals

|}

Semifinals

|}

7th place

|}

5th place

|}

3rd place

|}

Final

|}

Final standing

Individual awards

Best Scorer

Best Attacker

Best Blocker

Best Server

Best Digger

Best Setter

Best Receiver

References

World Championship
2001 in Croatian sport
International volleyball competitions hosted by Croatia
FIVB Volleyball Girls' U18 World Championship
2001 in Croatian women's sport